Fungu Yasini Island (or simply Fungu Yasini) is an uninhabited island in Tanzania, north of the country's capital city, Dar es Salaam and is one of the four islands of the Dar es Salaam Marine Reserve (DMRS). It is about three miles offshore in the Indian Ocean (Zanzibar Channel).

See also
Tanzania Marine Parks and Reserves Unit
List of protected areas of Tanzania

References

External links

Geography of Dar es Salaam
Uninhabited islands of Tanzania